Sabato De Sarno is an Italian designer and the creative director of the fashion house Gucci.
De Sarno started his career with Prada in 2005. He later worked for Dolce & Gabbana and Valentino.

His appointment with Gucci in 2023 is his first role leading a fashion house.

References

Living people

1980s births
Year of birth uncertain
Gucci people
Italian fashion designers
People from Naples